Quiriria Canton is one of the cantons of the Anzaldo Municipality, the second municipal section of the Esteban Arce Province in the Cochabamba Department in central Bolivia. Its seat is Quiriria.

References 

  Instituto Nacional de Estadistica de Bolivia  (INE)

External links
 Map of Esteban Arce Province

Cantons of Cochabamba Department
Cantons of Bolivia